Silvia Berger works at the Ministry of Economics and Production in Argentina, Latin American Council of Social Sciences (CLACSO), and is a post-graduate university teacher at the Latin American Social Sciences Institute (Facultad Latinoamericana de Ciencias Sociales or FLACSO). and past president of the International Association for Feminist Economics (IAFFE), her tenure was from 2017 to 2018.
7
Berger is a member of the editorial committee for the Mexican journal Ola Financiera.

Bibliography

Books

Chapters in books 
  Pdf (in Spanish).
  Pdf (in Spanish).
  Pdf (in Spanish).

Journal articles 
  Full text in Spanish (abstract in English).

Other

See also 
 International Association for Feminist Economics

References

External links 
 Latin American Council of Social Sciences (CLACSO)
 Profile page: Silvia Berger, International Association for Feminist Economics

Argentine educational theorists
Date of birth missing (living people)
Development economists
Feminist economists
Living people
Place of birth missing (living people)
Argentine women economists
Argentine economists
Year of birth missing (living people)